Tiptur Lok Sabha constituency is a former Lok Sabha constituency in Mysore State (Karnataka from 1957 to 1967).  This seat came into existence in 1957 and ceased to exist in 1966, before 1967 Lok Sabha Elections. This constituency was later merged with Tumkur Lok Sabha constituency.

Members of Parliament 

1952:Constituency does not exist
1957: C. R. Basappa, Indian National Congress
1962: C. R. Basappa, Indian National Congress
1966 onwards:Constituency does not exist.See Tumkur Lok Sabha constituency

See also
 Madhugiri Lok Sabha constituency
 Tumkur Lok Sabha constituency 
 Tumkur district
 List of former constituencies of the Lok Sabha

Notes

Tumkur district
1967 disestablishments in India
Lok Sabha constituencies in Mysore
Former constituencies of the Lok Sabha
Constituencies disestablished in 1967
Former Lok Sabha constituencies of Karnataka